Royal Air Force Thruxton or more simply RAF Thruxton is a former Royal Air Force station located  west of Andover, Hampshire and about  southwest of London.

Opened in 1942, it was used by both the Royal Air Force and United States Army Air Forces.

During the war Thruxton was used primarily as a combat fighter airfield.

However, paratroops who participated in the Bruneval raid (Operation Biting) in which German radar technology was captured took off from here in Armstrong Whitworth Whitley bombers on the evening of 27 February 1942. Also, gliders used in the D-day landings operated from here.

After the war it was closed in 1946.

Today the site is occupied by the Thruxton Circuit. It remains an active aerodrome at the same time, now named Thruxton Aerodrome.

History
While under United States Army Air Forces (USAAF) control, it was known as USAAF Station AAF-407 for security reasons, and by which it was referred to instead of location. Its station-ID was "TX".

Thruxton was transferred to the USAAF Ninth Air Force on 3 January 1944.  On 1 March the 366th Fighter Group with Republic P-47 Thunderbolts were transferred to the airfield from RAF Membury.  Operational squadrons of the group were:
 389th Fighter Squadron (A6)
 390th Fighter Squadron (B2)
 391st Fighter Squadron (A8)

The 366th was a group of Ninth Air Force's 71st Fighter Wing, IX Tactical Air Command. The group moved to its Advanced Landing Ground (ALG) at St. Pierre du Mont, France (ALG A-1) on 17 June 1944 .

Units
The following units were here at some point:

Current use
Upon its release from military use, in 1947 the field was leased by the Wiltshire School of Flying, whose engineering arm designed and built numbers of the Thruxton Jackeroo - a four-seat conversion of the DH82 Tiger Moth. Over the next few years their training fleet was joined at Thruxton by substantial numbers of light aircraft.

Flight training at the airfield is now provided by Western Air (Thruxton) Ltd at what is now known as Thruxton Airport. The southwest end of the former 02/20 secondary runway is now used as an aircraft parking ramp with the airport facilities also being built on the former runway. The northeast end of the runway still exists, but is largely abandoned, with parts of it also used for aircraft parking.  The airport uses part of the former main 07/25 wartime runway for takeoffs/ landings.  A grass runway was built parallel to the 12/30 secondary runway, the wartime concreted runway being in a deteriorating state and unused.

Thruxton airfield is also the operational airfield for Hampshire and Isle of Wight Air Ambulance service.

Motorcycle racing started in 1950 with the famous Thruxton 500 motorcycle endurance race, followed by cars in 1952.  The runway and perimeter roads formed the original circuit until a new track was laid in 1968 utilizing the former airfield perimeter track  At 2.356 miles (3.792 km), the new circuit uses only the perimeter road with the addition of a chicane called Club and a series of three tight corners called Campbell, Cobb and Seagrave.   All of the loop and pan dispersal areas have been removed.

There is no flying on race days but the airfield is used for flying during practice and test days on the motor circuit.

See also

List of former Royal Air Force stations
 Thruxton Circuit

References

Citations

Bibliography
 Freeman, Roger A. (1994) UK Airfields of the Ninth: Then and Now 1994. After the Battle 
 Freeman, Roger A. (1996) The Ninth Air Force in Colour: UK and the Continent-World War Two. After the Battle 
 Maurer, Maurer (1983). Air Force Combat Units Of World War II. Maxwell AFB, Alabama: Office of Air Force History. .
 Thruxton Airfield at www.controltowers.co.uk  
 USAAS-USAAC-USAAF-USAF Aircraft Serial Numbers—1908 to Present

External links

 Photographs of RAF Thruxton from the Geograph British Isles project

Airfields of the IX Fighter Command in the United Kingdom
Military units and formations established in 1941
Military units and formations disestablished in 1946
Parachuting in the United Kingdom
Royal Air Force stations in Hampshire
Royal Air Force stations of World War II in the United Kingdom